KLRZ is a sports radio station.

The station, which signed on the air in 1992, is now owned by Coastal Broadcasting Of Larose. In July 2005, Citadel Broadcasting entered into a $6,000,000 agreement to buy the station. However, after Hurricane Katrina, they had backed out of the purchase. In fact, a new tower had been built to put a better signal into New Orleans, and was turned on the week before Katrina hit. Speculation was that Citadel was going to either sign on a Rockin' Country format onto this signal (which eventually was put on 106.7) or move the format of 106.7 the End to 100.3.

On January 1, 2014, the station has dropped the cajun music and became the ESPN Radio affiliate in the New Orleans Market. The station was named the new flagship station of the NBA New Orleans Pelicans on June 26, 2019.

History
In the early to mid 1990s, this station's moniker was Z-100, and was playing a Top 40/Rhythmic Hybrid Format aimed at the New Orleans market at the time. The format was then changed to a Classic Rock format with a mid morning talk show in the mid 1990s. A format of regional music called swamp pop was produced on the radio station for a number of years using the branding "Rajun Cajun". This format was later moved to sister station KLEB in 2014.

References

External links
ESPN New Orleans
"The Rajun' Cajun" online!

KLRZ
Sports radio stations in the United States
Radio stations established in 1992